This list of the tallest buildings and structures in Afghanistan ranks skyscrapers, towers and other structures in Afghanistan by their height.

The current tallest building in Afghanistan is the Kabul Tower in Kabul city. The 18-storey Kabul Tower stands 87 metres (285 ft) to the tip and has an architectural height of 75 metres (246 ft).

Tallest structures
This list ranks the tallest buildings and structures in Afghanistan, based on standard height measurement. Only completed or topped out structures are included.

Under construction
This list ranks buildings and structures that are under construction in Afghanistan and are planned to rise at least 50 m (165 ft) or 10 floors tall.  Buildings under construction that have already been topped out are also included, as are those whose construction has been suspended.

See also 

 List of dams and reservoirs in Afghanistan
 List of tallest buildings and structures in South Asia
 List of tallest buildings in Pakistan
 List of tallest buildings in Asia

References 

 
Tallest
Afghanistan
Afghanistan